6-Nitroquipazine (developmental code name DU-24,565) is a potent and selective serotonin reuptake inhibitor used in scientific research.

6-Nitroquipazine has been found to inhibit melanogenesis in-vitro, suggesting that it can be used for skin whitening.

See also
 Quipazine

References

Nitro compounds
Piperazines
Quinolines
Serotonin reuptake inhibitors